Khwansuda Phuangkitcha (born 31 August 2000) is a Thai Para Taekwondo practitioner. She became the first world champion in Para Taekwondo for Thailand, following her victory in the 49 kg event at the 2019 World Championship in Antalya, Turkey. She competed at the 2020 Summer Paralympics in the 49 kg category and won the bronze medal in the event. Following her win, she became Thailand's first Para Taekwondo medalist at the Paralympic Games.

References

2000 births
Living people
Khwansuda Phuangkitcha
Khwansuda Phuangkitcha
Khwansuda Phuangkitcha
Paralympic medalists in taekwondo
Medalists at the 2020 Summer Paralympics
Taekwondo practitioners at the 2020 Summer Paralympics
Khwansuda Phuangkitcha
Khwansuda Phuangkitcha